Feast of the Hunters' Moon is the debut album by Portland, Oregon-based string band Black Prairie, released in 2010 on Sugar Hill Records.

Track list
 Across The Black Prairie
 Red Rocking Chair
 Back Alley
 Ostinato Del Caminito
 A Prairie Musette
 Crooked Little Heart
 Annie McGuire
 Atrocity at Celilo Falls
 Tango Oscuro
 Single Mistake
 Full Moon in June
 Home Made Lemonade
 The Blackest Crow

Personnel
Jenny Conlee - Accordion
Chris Funk - Resonator guitar
Jon Neufeld - Guitar
Nate Query - Bass
Annalisa Tornfelt - Fiddle and Vocals
Tucker Martine - Producer

Chart performance

References

External links
 Official Black Prairie website

2010 albums
Black Prairie albums
Sugar Hill Records albums
Albums produced by Tucker Martine